Axel Heiberg Island is an uninhabited island in the Qikiqtaaluk Region, Nunavut, Canada. Located in the Arctic Ocean, it is the 32nd largest island in the world and Canada's seventh largest island. It is named after Axel Heiberg.

One of the larger members of the Arctic Archipelago, it is also a member of the Sverdrup Islands and Queen Elizabeth Islands. It is known for its unusual fossil forests, which date from the Eocene period. Owing to the lack of mineralization in many of the forest specimens, the traditional characterization of "fossilisation" fails for these forests and "mummification" may be a clearer description. The fossil records provide strong evidence that the Axel Heiberg forest was a high-latitude wetland forest.

History

Axel Heiberg Island has been inhabited in the past by the Inuit, but was uninhabited by the time it was named by Otto Sverdrup, who explored it in 1900–01. He named it after Axel Heiberg, financial director of the Norwegian Ringnes brewery which sponsored the expedition. Other explorers visited the island during the early 20th century, during which time it was claimed by Norway until 1930. It is now part of Nunavut Territory, Canada. It wasn't until the late 1940s that the island was aerially photographed by the United States Army Air Forces' Operation Polaris. In 1955 two geologists of the Geological Survey of Canada, N.J. McMillan and Souther traversed the interior as part of Operation Franklin. McMillan's observations of Bunde Glacier, in northwest Axel Heiberg Island, are the earliest glaciological observations on the ground to have found their way into a scientific publication.

In 1959, scientists from McGill University explored Expedition Fiord (previously Sør Fjord or South Fiord) in central Axel Heiberg Island. It consists of a small research hut, a cookhouse and 2 temporary structures that can comfortably accommodate 8–12 persons. The station was initially heavily utilized during the early 1960s, during which a population of 20 was present. The McGill Arctic Research Station is active from March to August with research currently focused on polar geomorphology, geology, glaciology, permafrost, climate change, and polar microbiology. Over the last 10–15 years, it has served as a significant Mars analogue for astrobiology investigations studying life and habitability of polar cryoenvironments and field-testing planetary exploration instrumentation platforms.

In the summer of 1972, a British Army Mountaineering Association expedition resulted in the naming of Scaife Glacier, following the accidental death of Sergeant Kenneth Scaife.

During the summer of 1986, a Canadian expedition headed by Dr. James Basinger set out to investigate a very unusual fossil forest on Axel Heiberg. The findings of these and subsequent expeditions have since been popularly reported in Canada. Over 40 million years ago during the Eocene epoch, a forest of tall trees flourished on Axel Heiberg Island. At the time, the polar climate was warm, but the winters were still continuously dark for three months. As the trees fell, the fine sediment in which the forest grew protected the plants. Instead of turning into petrified "stone" fossils, they were ultimately mummified by the cold, dry Arctic climate, and only recently exposed by erosion. Scientists from the Komarov Botanical Institute of the Russian Academy of Sciences in Saint Petersburg provided a few grams of Metasequoia conifer wood from the site to genetics researchers at the National University of Altai, who compared the DNA sequences of the ancient wood with DNA of modern woody plants and found them to be almost identical. Komarov Institute scientists also discovered double strand DNA molecules in Metasequoia fossil leaves from Axel Heiberg Island.

As late as 1999, the preservation of this unique site was a concern, as the fossil wood was easily damaged and eroded once exposed. There were concerns that wood was being taken by Arctic cruise ship tourists, and that the site was being disturbed by Canadian military helicopters from a nearby base, and even by scientists themselves in their studies. There were calls for more protection for the area. It currently has no official status, in part because land claims had to be settled. But now Nunavut is looking at how best to protect the fossil forest, possibly by setting up a territorial park to be called Napaaqtulik, "where there are trees".

Interesting animal fossils have been discovered on the island, including a remarkably preserved specimen of an ancient Aurorachelys turtle and, identified in 2016, the humerus of a Tingmiatornis bird.

Glaciation
White Glacier is a valley glacier occupying  in the Expedition Fiord area of Axel Heiberg Island. Ice thickness reaches or exceeds . Its maximum extension in recent history, marking the advance of the glacier in response to the cooling of the Little Ice Age, was reached not earlier than the late 18th century, and more probably at the beginning of the 20th century. White Glacier has been the subject of many papers in the glaciological literature since 1960, e.g. Müller (1962) was the source of a now-classical diagram elaborating and illustrating the concept of "glacier facies".

Population
The island is uninhabited except for the seasonal McGill Arctic Research Station operated by McGill University.

Lost Hammer Spring
The Lost Hammer Spring, located in the central west region of the island is the coldest and saltiest of all Arctic springs described to date. Continuous gas emissions from the spring indicate an underlying thermogenic methane source. On the basis of these properties, this spring is considered a significant astrobiology analogue site for possible habitats currently present on Mars and the cold moons Europa and Enceladus.

Microbes have been found at this site which do not depend on organic material or oxygen, but only on simple inorganic compounds. These inorganic compounds are present on Mars.

Views of the island

See also
Ellesmere Island Volcanics

References

Further reading

 
 
 
 
Chih-Ying Lay, Nadia C. S. Mykytczuk, Étienne Yergeau, Guillaume Lamarche-Gagnon, Charles W. Greer, & Lyle G. Whyte, "Defining the Functional Potential and Active Community Members of a Sediment Microbial Community in a High-Arctic Hypersaline Subzero Spring," Applied and Environmental Microbiology, Volume 79 Number 12 (June 2013), p. 3637–3648. http://aem.asm.org/content/79/12/3637

External links
 Axel Heiberg Island in the Atlas of Canada - Toporama; Natural Resources Canada
 Axel Heiberg Island's Eocene forests
 Unearthing a Frozen Forest
 Arctic Redwood Fossils Are Clues to Ancient Climates

Islands of the Queen Elizabeth Islands
Sverdrup Islands
Uninhabited islands of Qikiqtaaluk Region